Rusudan Goginashvili (born 6 April 2001) is a Georgian swimmer. She competed in the women's 50 metre backstroke event at the 2017 World Aquatics Championships.

References

2001 births
Living people
Female swimmers from Georgia (country)
Place of birth missing (living people)
Female backstroke swimmers